Syllepte melanomma is a moth in the family Crambidae. It was described by George Hampson in 1912. It is found in Nigeria.

The wingspan is 26–28 mm. The forewings are ochreous white, with somewhat oblique blackish subbasal and antemedial bands, the latter confluent with a spot on its outer side below the cell. There are somewhat quadrate blackish spots in the end of the cell and on the discocellulars, confluent on the median nervure, and a band from the lower angle of the cell to the inner margin. The terminal area is broadly blackish with a cupreous gloss and an ochreous-white postmedial bar on it from the costa to vein 6. The hindwings are ochreous white with a faint diffused dark subbasal band and a blackish discoidal spot. There is a dark postmedial band, oblique to vein 3, then bent inwards to the lower angle of the cell and oblique to above the tornus. The terminal area is blackish with a cupreous gloss, joined at vein 2 by a spur from the postmedial band and with an ochreous-white subterminal band on it from vein 4 to near the tornus.

References

Moths described in 1912
melanomma
Moths of Africa